Governor Burns may refer to:

Alan Burns (colonial administrator) (1887–1980), Governor of British Honduras
John A. Burns (1909–1975), 2nd Governor of Hawaii
W. Haydon Burns (1912–1987), 35th Governor of Florida

See also
James F. Byrnes (1882–1972), 104th Governor of South Carolina